Aldingham is a civil parish in the South Lakeland District of Cumbria, England. It contains 28 listed buildings that are recorded in the National Heritage List for England. Of these, one is listed at Grade I, the highest of the three grades, one is at Grade II*, the middle grade, and the others are at Grade II, the lowest grade.  The parish contains villages, including Aldingham, Baycliff, Dendron, Leece, Gleaston, and Scales, and the surrounding countryside.  The listed buildings include houses and associated structures, farmhouses and farm buildings, churches and items in a churchyard, a ruined castle, a Friends' burial ground, a former corn mill, two village halls, one originally a malt kiln, three follies, and four limekilns.


Key

Buildings

References

Citations

Sources

Lists of listed buildings in Cumbria